The MV Powerful is a Danish-flagged cargo ship owned by Excel Maritime Carriers Ltd. of Greece. It was attacked with the intention of hijack by Somali pirates using assault rifles on November 11, 2008 in the Gulf of Aden off the Horn of Africa. Its capture was thwarted by the Royal Marines of the British frigate, as well as the crew of a Russian .

The engagement was attributed to Operation Enduring Freedom - Horn of Africa and was described by The Times as "the first time the Royal Navy had been engaged in a fatal shoot-out on the high seas in living memory."

See also
Piracy in Somalia

References

Cargo ships of Denmark
Maritime incidents in 2008
Ships built in China
Cargo ships of Greece
Piracy in Somalia
Royal Marines
Gulf of Aden
1993 ships